The Goat Farm Arts Center is a visual and performing arts center located in West Midtown, Atlanta, Georgia. The center is housed in a 19th-century complex of industrial buildings and contains the studio space of over 300 artists. Goat Farm hosts music concerts, traditional and experimental theatrical performances, film screenings, contemporary dance performances, art exhibitions, artist residency programs, and professional ballet and contemporary dance classes. It is also home to resident performance companies gloATL, Saiah Theater, and The Collective Project.

History
It was built during the 1880s, opened in 1889, and expanded in various phases through the early 1930s. It was Edward Van Winkle's third complex in Atlanta  - a previous one was located in today's Luckie Marietta district. By 1898, the site specialized in cotton-related machinery, and won awards at international expositions and state fairs. In 1912, the Murray Company of Texas bought out Van Winkle and the site became known as "Murray's Mill." During World War II, the complex produced ammunition and mortars.

In the early 1970s Robert Haywood bought the site and sculptors, musicians, painters and photographers set up studios there. For a time in the early 2000s space was rented to antique dealers as "The Shops at Murray Mill", but the antique mall never took off.  The site remained unused for many years.

On July 15, 2010, the property was sold for a reported $7 million to Hallister Development, specialists in renovating historic properties. Hallister stated that it planned to preserve and boost the property as an arts-friendly community.

Hallister Development ultimately chose not to pursue redevelopment of the site into a residential/commercial complex.  In 2009, Hallister made the decision to develop the site into a Center for the Visual and Performing Arts containing performance and exhibition halls, a cafe/library, an on-site organic farm, an education center, a 5000 square foot space dedicated to contemporary dance, and creative studios for artists.

In 2010, it was used for filming in the episode "Vatos" of The Walking Dead. In 2012, it was used for The Hunger Games: Catching Fire filming.

Organization 

The Goat Farm primarily explores experimental and innovative works.  The Arts Center is a for-profit arts model and does not operate on public funding, donations or grants.  Its non-traditional rustic auditoriums are Goodson Yard, The Rodriguez Room, The Warhorse and three exterior venues - The Village Green, Warhorse Court and The Dovetail.  Ballet and contemporary dance classes are offered through resident dance troupe gloATL.  Its education and career development platform, Stimulus Diffusion, connects creatives to a wide variety of educational initiatives in Atlanta. The Goat Farm Arts Center provides its performance and exhibition halls to artists through a curatorial process in which those who wish to use the space submit a proposal. Once an idea is selected, the Goat Farm invests in and works with the artists and/or performance groups to actualize the concept.  All of the selected artists receive The Goat Farm's AIP (Arts Investment Package), which includes financial assistance, direct funding, production assistance, marketing assistance and rehearsal, performance, exhibition or classroom space.

Gallery

References

External links
 Felicia Feaster, "The Goat Farm: A Westside Arts Center", "Spotlight on the Arts", Atlanta magazine, December 2011, p. 38
 Thomas Wheatley, "Goat Farm gets sold: Atlanta cotton gin-turned-artists’ space finds new owner", Creative Loafing, July 29, 2010
 Thomas Wheatley, "More on the Goat Farm's future plans", Creative Loafing, July 30, 2010
 "E. Van Winkle Gin and Machine Works", National Register of Historic Places
 The Goat Farm Atlanta Facebook page

Event venues on the National Register of Historic Places in Georgia (U.S. state)
Buildings and structures in Atlanta
Industrial buildings and structures in Georgia (U.S. state)
Industrial landmarks in Atlanta
Culture of Atlanta
Arts centers in Georgia (U.S. state)
National Register of Historic Places in Atlanta
Adaptive reuse of industrial structures in Atlanta
Mixed-use developments in Georgia (U.S. state)